Gianni Corsaro (29 April 1925 - 12 April 2006) was an Italian racewalker who competed at the 1948 Summer Olympics and the 1960 Summer Olympics.

See also
 Italian team at the running events
 Italy at the IAAF World Race Walking Cup

References

External links
 

1925 births
2006 deaths
Athletes (track and field) at the 1948 Summer Olympics
Athletes (track and field) at the 1960 Summer Olympics
Italian male racewalkers
Olympic athletes of Italy
Mediterranean Games bronze medalists for Italy
Mediterranean Games medalists in athletics
Athletes (track and field) at the 1963 Mediterranean Games
20th-century Italian people
21st-century Italian people